Bình Long is a former province in South Vietnam, which now corresponds to the western part of Bình Phước province. It was formed on 22 October 1956. Following Vietnam's reunification, Bình Long, Phước Long and Bình Dương provinces were combined to form Sông Bé province. By the end of  1996, Sông Bé province was dissolved and, along with Bình Long, now comprises part of Bình Phước province.

Districts
 An Lộc
 Lộc Ninh
 Chơn Thành

Provinces of South Vietnam
Southeast (Vietnam)
Bình Phước province